General elections were held in Uganda on 23 March 1961. They were the first time direct elections to the Legislative Council had been held across the entire country. The result was a victory for the Democratic Party, which won 44 of the 82 seats (excluding Buganda).

Results

References

Uganda
1961 in Uganda
Elections in Uganda
Uganda Protectorate
Election and referendum articles with incomplete results